August First Film Studio, or Bayi Film Studio (Chinese: 八一电影制片厂; pinyin: Bāyī diànyǐng zhì piàn chǎng), is the only military film studio in China. It was founded on August 1, 1952 to film It is a comprehensive film studio with the production capacity of feature films, battlefield documentaries, military education films, news documentaries, national defense scientific research films, TV dramas and other films. The unit's main business area is located in Fengtai District, Beijing, and consists of Wang Zuo Film and Television Base and Hubei Film and Television Base.

History
In March 1951, with the approval of the Culture and Education Commission and the Central Military Commission of the Central People's Government of the People's Republic of China, the Military Education Film Studio of the General Political Department of the Central Military Commission was prepared to be established. 

On August 1, 1952, the factory was officially established and named the People's Liberation Army Film Studio. In the early days of the factory, it mainly produced military educational films and news documentaries. In 1955, the studio was granted funding to produce feature films on its own, breaking a brief monopoly by the China Film Group Corporation. From then on, PLA Film and CFGC carried a duopoly in the Chinese film industry until the 1990s.

In 1956, it was rebranded as August First (Bayi) Film Studio. 

Bayi Film Studio adheres to the direction of serving the people and serving socialism, and implements the policy of "letting a hundred flowers bloom and a hundred schools of thought contend", reflecting the struggle and life of the people's army in the Chinese people's previous revolutionary wars and socialist construction periods, and shaping the screen image of outstanding soldiers, to educate the PLA in general on socialism, patriotism, collectivism and revolutionary heroism, and to promote the revolutionization, modernization and regularization of the forces to all Chinese.

As of 2014, more than 2,200 films (series) of various kinds have been produced. Among them:
 236 feature films (including stage art films).
 571 military educational films and national defense scientific research films (series).
 1049 documentaries (series).
 6 art films.
 9 high-definition digital movies.
 81 TV dramas.
 70 TV feature films.
 79 dubbed films.

Among them, 78 won the Excellent Film Award of the Ministry of Culture and the Ministry of Radio, Film and Television of the People's Republic of China, 30 won the Literary and Art Award of the Chinese People's Liberation Army, 12 won the Excellent Film Award of the General Political Department, and 11 won the Excellent Film Award of the General Staff and the General Political Department. Military Education Film Award, 33 films won the Excellent Film Award of the General Staff Department, 10 films won the "Popular Film" Hundred Flowers Award, 19 films won the Golden Rooster Award for Chinese Films, 3 films won the Golden Bridge Award for Chinese Documentary Series, and 1 film won the National Youth and Children's Literature and Art Works Creation Award; 3 people won the "Popular Film" Hundred Flowers Award for individual awards, and 44 people won the Chinese Film Golden Rooster Awards for individual awards. In addition, 13 films and 11 people have won awards internationally. 

In April 1982, the monthly magazine "August 1st Film" was published, which is a comprehensive film publication focusing on film literature. 

In January 1995, it was renamed "Chinese and Foreign Military Film and Television - August 1st Studio". In 2018, according to the decision of the Central Military Commission, it was renamed anew as the Film and Television Production Department of the PLA Cultural and Art Center of the Political Work Department, keeping the Bayi Studio as its primary brand for its productions.

"Youth" directed by Feng Xiaogang was released at the end of 2017.

Organization
 Department of Feature Film Production
 Department of Military Education
 Department of Television Production
 Department of Technology
 Audiovisual and 3D Department
 Videos City
The main operating area of the Bayi Film Studio of the Chinese People's Liberation Army is located in Fengtai District, Beijing, and it consists of Wangzuo Film and Television Base and Hubei Film and Television Base.

The film and television production of Bayi Film Studio includes script creation, pre-shooting, post-production, technical support, publicity and distribution and other departments. Professional positions such as restoration, color matching, pyrotechnics, scenery setting, costumes, photography maintenance and lighting.

List of heads

References

External links 

Chinese film studios
Film production companies of China
State-owned film companies
Mass media companies established in 1952
1952 establishments in China
Companies based in Beijing
Film distributors of China
People's Liberation Army branches